Water polo was contested only for men at the 1962 Asian Games in Jakarta, Indonesia from 28 August to 1 September 1962 at the Senayan Swimming Stadium.

Japan won the gold medal in round robin competition, Indonesia finished second and Singapore finished on the bronze medal position to complete the podium.

Medalists

Results

Final standing

References
 Asian Games water polo medalists

External links
 Results

 
1962 Asian Games events
1962
Asian Games
1962 Asian Games